Robert James Malone (born February 4, 1988) is a former American football punter.  He was signed by the Jacksonville Jaguars as an undrafted free agent in 2010. He played college football at Fresno State.

He was also a member of the Tampa Bay Buccaneers, Detroit Lions, San Diego Chargers, New York Jets, and Washington Redskins.

College career
Malone played college football at Fresno State. There he was a first-team All-WAC selection after punting 44 times for a 45.2-yard average, with 17 of his kicks downed inside the opponent's 20-yard line.  He also kicked 15 punts for 50 or more yards, including a career long of 74. In his collegiate career, Malone played in 41 games and punted 120 times for 5,117 yards with a 42.6-yard average and 44 punts inside the 20.

Professional career

Jacksonville Jaguars
Malone originally entered the NFL as an undrafted free agent with the Jacksonville Jaguars in the spring of 2010. However, he was released before training camp by the Jaguars, who stuck with their incumbent punter Adam Podlesh.

Tampa Bay Buccaneers
Malone was signed by the Buccaneers on October 13, 2010 to replace Chris Bryan as the team's punter. He was waived on August 29, 2011.

Detroit Lions
On November 11, 2011, Malone signed with the Detroit Lions after an injury to Ryan Donahue. He was waived on November 15 and was replaced by Ben Graham.

San Diego Chargers
He signed with the Chargers on May 30, 2012.

New York Jets
Malone was signed by the New York Jets on September 4, 2012. He became the team's starting punter with the release of incumbent T. J. Conley. He was released on September 16, 2013.

Washington Redskins
Malone signed a reserve/future contract with the Washington Redskins on December 31, 2013. He was waived for final roster cuts on August 29, 2014.

New York Giants
Malone signed a contract with the New York Giants in 2015. On September 1, 2015, he was waived by the Giants.

Personal life
Robert Malone grew up in Riverside, CA and went to Martin Luther King High School. He punted for the high school football team. His cousin, Tom Malone, was an NFL punter and played college football at USC. In October 2022, Robert was inducted into the Martin Luther King Athletic Hall of Fame.

References

External links
 Fresno State Bulldogs bio

1988 births
Living people
Players of American football from California
Sportspeople from Riverside, California
American football punters
Fresno State Bulldogs football players
Jacksonville Jaguars players
Tampa Bay Buccaneers players
Detroit Lions players
New York Jets players
Washington Redskins players
New York Giants players